Karl-Heinz Lehmann (born 2 January 1957) is a German former judoka who competed in the 1980 Summer Olympics.

References

External links
 

1957 births
Living people
German male judoka
Olympic judoka of East Germany
Judoka at the 1980 Summer Olympics
Olympic bronze medalists for East Germany
Olympic medalists in judo
Medalists at the 1980 Summer Olympics
20th-century German people